Montastruc-la-Conseillère is a commune in the Haute-Garonne department of southwestern France.

Population
The inhabitants of the commune are known as Montastrucoises and Montastrucois in French.

Twin towns
Montastruc-la-Conseillère is twinned with:
 Maizières-lès-Metz, France
 Sant Pere Pescador, Spain

Transport
Montastruc-la-Conseillère station has rail connections to Toulouse, Castres, Albi and Rodez.

See also
Communes of the Haute-Garonne department

References

Communes of Haute-Garonne